Cochlespira cavalier is a species of sea snail, a marine gastropod mollusk in the family Cochlespiridae.

References

 Garcia E.F. (2010) Description of four new species of Cochlespira (Gastropoda: Turridae) from the New World. Novapex, 11(4): 107–113

External links

cavalier
Gastropods described in 2010